Fraser Andrew Nelson (born 14 May 1973) is a British political journalist and editor of The Spectator magazine.

Early and personal life
Nelson was born in Truro, Cornwall, England but raised in Nairn, Highland, Scotland. He attended Nairn Academy before boarding at Dollar Academy while his father, who was in the Royal Air Force, was posted to Cyprus. He described himself as "one of a handful of Catholics at a Protestant school." He went on to study History and Politics at the University of Glasgow and gained a diploma in Journalism at City University. He once worked as a barman at Cleos in Rosyth.

Married with two sons and a daughter, he and his family live in Twickenham. He is married to Linda, a Swede, and said in 2014, "I am a soppy Europhile who speaks a second language at home. The idea of a united Europe was one that really excited me when I was younger, and which I love now."

Journalism career
Nelson began his journalistic career as a business reporter with The Times in 1997, followed by a short spell as Scottish political correspondent. At a party he met Andrew Neil, then editor of The Scotsman who recruited him as its political editor in 2001. In 2003 he moved to The Business, a sister title of The Scotsman in the Barclay brothers' Press Holdings group.

In July 2004 the brothers bought The Telegraph Group, which included The Spectator and in December 2005 they sold The Scotsman Publications Ltd. Neil had been appointed Chief Executive of The Spectator after the Barclays bought it, and in 2006 he brought in Nelson as associate editor and then political editor of the magazine. He replaced Matthew d'Ancona as editor of The Spectator when the latter left in August 2009. Under his editorship, the magazine has reached a record high in print circulation.

In addition to his role as editor of The Spectator, Nelson was a political columnist for the News of the World from 2006 and a board director with the Centre for Policy Studies think tank. He was named Political Columnist of the Year in the 2009 Comment Awards.

In 2013, the Evening Standard named Nelson as one of the most influential journalists working in London. The British Society of Magazine Editors named Nelson the 2013 Editors' Editor of the Year. In the same year he won the British Press Award as Political Journalist of the Year.

Style and beliefs
Nelson is a supporter of the Conservative Party. He describes The Spectator magazine under his editorship as "right of centre, but not strongly right of centre". He on occasion criticised David Cameron's leadership but was generally supportive, and has also been known to praise Cameron's Liberal Democrat coalition partner from 2010 to 2015, Nick Clegg.

In May 2018 he was heavily criticised for publishing a defence of German troops by Taki Theodoracopulos titled "In praise of the Wehrmacht" which said readers should feel sorry for Wehrmacht soldiers at Normandy.

Immigration
Nelson has stated that he is a supporter of immigration.

On 4 April 2014, Nelson wrote a piece for the Daily Telegraph entitled "The British Muslim is truly one among us – and proud to be so", which praised integration of mainstream Islam in the UK and described it as one "of our great success stories". He returned to the theme in May 2015, with an article entitled "The unsayable truth about immigration: it's been a stunning success for Britain".

 "The irony is that Britain does not need legislation to make it more liberal. It can already claim to be one of the most tolerant places on earth. The 2011 census showed how we have absorbed the unprecedented rates of immigration over the past decade without anything like the far-Right backlash seen on the Continent."

Gay marriage
 "If the Unitarian Church and certain strands of Judaism want to marry gay couples on their premises, then why should government stand in their way? For the record, I quite agree. Religious freedom in Britain ought to be universal, extended to the handful of churches or synagogues who want same-sex marriage."

The nuclear family
 David Cameron is the "Prime Minister of a country where 48% of children will see their parents split up. Strip out immigrants (who flatter most social statistics) and only a minority of British babies are born to married parents. By the age of 16, a British child is considerably more likely to have a television in the bedroom than a father in the house."

Charlie Hebdo
Nelson wrote two days after the Charlie Hebdo shooting a reflective piece in which he compared that massacre to the Deal barracks bombing by the Provisional Irish Republican Army:

Nelson also noted that the Muslim Council of Britain released an unequivocal statement condemning the Paris massacre, while the Islamic Human Rights Commission had released nothing to that date.

References

Further reading
 Interview in the Sunday Herald, June 2009
 Interview in the Independent on Sunday, March 2010

External links
 Articles at The Spectator

 

1973 births
Living people
Alumni of the University of Glasgow
Place of birth missing (living people)
People educated at Dollar Academy
People educated at Nairn Academy
People from Nairn
Scottish columnists
Scottish journalists
The Spectator editors
The Scotsman people
The Times people